The 1867 Port Chalmers by-election was a by-election held on 15 June 1867 in the  electorate during the 4th New Zealand Parliament.

The by-election was caused by the death on 11 February of the incumbent MP Thomas Dick. The by-election was won by David Forsyth Main.

Results
The following table gives the election result, which was contested by five candidates, although Main and Captain Malcolm were the only serious contenders:

References

Port Chalmers 1867
1867 elections in New Zealand
Politics of Otago
June 1867 events